WEPV-LP is a Catholic Religious formatted broadcast radio station. The station is licensed to Hampton, Virginia and serving Hampton and Newport News in Virginia. WEPV-LP is owned and operated by St. Mary Star of the Sea Catholic Church.

References

External links
 

2017 establishments in Virginia
Catholic radio stations
Radio stations established in 2017
EPV-LP
EPV-LP
Hampton, Virginia
Catholic Church in North Carolina